Metasia virginalis is a moth in the family Crambidae. It was described by Ragonot in 1894. It is found in Turkey.

The wingspan is about 17 mm.

References

Moths described in 1894
Metasia